KTBV-LD, virtual and VHF digital channel 12, is an HSN-affiliated television station licensed to Los Angeles, California, United States. The station is owned by Edge Spectrum.

Digital television

Digital channels 
The station's digital signal is multiplexed:

References 

Television stations in Los Angeles
Television channels and stations established in 2004
Low-power television stations in the United States